Jagoff or jag-off is an American English derogatory slang term from Pittsburghese meaning a person who is a jerk, stupid or inept. It is most prominent in the Pittsburgh area and Pennsylvania in general, along with wide use in the City of Chicago, 
particularly in the Irish taverns.  The Dictionary of American Regional English defines the term as a "general term of disparagement". It is an archetypical Pittsburgh word, conjuring feelings of delight among Pittsburgh expatriates.

According to Barbara Johnstone, professor of English and linguistics at Carnegie Mellon University, the term has its roots in the northern British Isles, an area that supplied many immigrants to Pittsburgh. It is derived from the verb "to jag". which means "to prick or poke". Johnstone said that among local Pittsburghers, "Nobody thinks of these derivatives of 'jag' as obscene", though non-local fellow Americans often mishear "jagoff" as the much more offensive slang term "jack off".

Use in media and public events

Politics
On December 8, 2015, Mayor John Fetterman of Braddock, Pennsylvania, declared Donald Trump a jagoff in a press release after Trump called for a ban of all Muslims travelling to the United States.

On July 30, 2016, Pittsburgh native Mark Cuban, a technology entrepreneur and owner of the Dallas Mavericks, referred to Trump as a "jagoff" during a speech in Pittsburgh, adding "Is there any bigger jagoff in the world than Donald Trump?" Cuban later endorsed Hillary Clinton for president of the United States.

Movies
The term was often used by Michael Keaton, a native of the Pittsburgh region, in many of his early films, most notably Night Shift and Gung Ho.

The term was used once in the 1999 film The Matrix. In the scene where Cypher (Joe Pantoliano) reveals to Trinity (Carrie-Anne Moss) that he switched sides, he says of Morpheus (Laurence Fishburne) “But most of all, I’m tired of that jagoff and I’m tired of his bullshit.”

The term was used in the 2010 Denzel Washington film Unstoppable as a nod to the fact that the movie was filmed in Pittsburgh.

The term was often used in Martin Scorsese's Casino mainly by Joe Pesci’s character Nicky Santoro. It was also used in a scene where a hitman referred to a target as a jag-off. The target was killed in a series of assassinations that took place to silence people that might have testified against mob bosses that skimmed said casino in the movie.

The term was used multiple times by characters in Magnolia Pictures' Buffaloed.

It's used in My Big Fat Greek Wedding.

The term was also used by Chevy Chase’s character, Clark Griswold in Vacation (1983). In response to his wife discussing her cousin Normie, she said “Normie’s always been flighty,” Clark responds with, “he’s always been a jagoff.”

Television
SNL writer/actor Seth Meyers, the son of a Pittsburgh native, used the term and a Pittsburghese accent during a sketch entitled "Bar" in which he also performed a Bill Cowher impression.

The term was used on Final Space season one, episode seven. The artificial intelligence, H.U.E., states that "KVN is a jag-off, Gary."

The term was used in season one, episode twelve of The Good Place, where character Eleanor Shellstrop says to an activist outside a grocery store, "look what you made me do, jagoff."

The term was used by character Rick Sanchez in the cartoon Rick and Morty, season three, episode eight.

The term was used in episode 18 of season 3 of Chicago P.D. by Detective Erin Lindsay.  She was using it to describe an abusive ex-husband of a female shooting victim saying "Look at this jagoff."

The term was used in episode 19 of season 3 of Chicago P.D. by Detective Jay Halstead. He was questioning a bar employee about a woman who had been kidnapped and, when he didn't like the guy's answer, said "Don't be a jagoff!".

Video games
In Fallout 76, the term jagoff, along with many other terms of Pittsburghese, is used by the character Lucky Lou who hails from Pittsburgh.

Controversies over the term
In 2010, Pittsburgh-native and coach of the Kentucky Wildcats men's basketball team, John Calipari raised hackles in the media when he jokingly referred to fellow Pittsburgher John Buccigross as a "jagoff".

In 2012, David Shribman, a Massachusetts native and executive editor of the Pittsburgh Post-Gazette, issued a letter banning the use of the word "jagoff" anywhere in the newspaper. The decision was mocked by Chris Potter of the Pittsburgh City Paper, noting that Shribman's letter belied an utter lack of understanding of the actual etymology and history of the word, as he had confused it with the more base homophone, "jack off", common slang for masturbation. In response The Beaver County Times used some form of the term 19 times in a single article, suggesting that Shribman has "Jagoffphobia".

References

American slang
Culture of Pittsburgh